Montreuil-en-Caux (literally Montreuil in Caux) is a commune in the Seine-Maritime department in the Normandy region in northern France.

Geography

Population

Places of interest
 The church of St. Antoine and St. Sulpice, dating from the thirteenth century.
 Parts of an ancient château (now a farmhouse).
 The manorhouse of Hautot-Mesnil .

See also
Communes of the Seine-Maritime department

References

Communes of Seine-Maritime